The Breaker is a South Korean manhwa series written by Jeon Geuk-jin and illustrated by Park Jin-hwan under the pen name Kamaro. The Breaker was serialized in Daiwon C.I.'s Young Champs magazine between 2007 and 2010. A sequel, The Breaker: New Waves, was published on Daum Communications online comics portal from 2010 to 2015. A second sequel, The Breaker: Eternal Force began serialization in 2022 as a webtoon.

Plot
Chunwoo Han is a martial artist who earned the title of Nine Arts Dragon from the Murim, a secret martial arts society that exists in harmony with modern society. The Murim's government is the Martial Arts Alliance who has garnered Chunwoo's hatred by killing his martial arts teacher. In the present, Chunwoo Han transfers to a fictional school in Seoul for a mission given to him by the Black Forest Defense Group, an anti-government group who opposes the Martial Arts Alliance. At the school, he meets the protagonist Shiwoon Yi. To solve his bullying problem, Shiwoon has Chunwoo train him in martial arts. Chunwoo initiates his mission and frees Sosul, the head of the Sunwoo Clan, from the Martial Arts Alliance. As Chunwoo prepares to leave the country, the Martial Arts Alliance take Shiwoon hostage, forcing him to intervene. In the conflict, Chunwoo publicly renounces Shiwoon as his disciple and destroys his Qi-center which cripples his potential as a martial artist. In doing so, Shiwoon is no longer considered part of Murim and will be protected by law from martial artists who wish to take revenge on Chunwoo through Shiwoon. In the aftermath, Shiwoon is greeted by the Sunwoo Clan who reveal Sosul has named him as her successor.

The sequel The Breaker: New Waves continues with Shiwoon, who has declined his position as the head of the Sunwoo Clan. Meanwhile, the Martial Arts Alliance is losing its control over the world and a new group, acronymed SUC, begins terrorizing normal citizens under the name of the Nine Arts Dragon. Shiwoon becomes acquainted with Sera Kang who arranges a series of events and successfully restores Shiwoon's Qi-center. After learning about the existence of SUC, Shiwoon resolves to destroy them for tarnishing his teacher's name.

Characters
Shiwoon Yi
Shiwoon was a weak and cowardly boy who was constantly bullied. After meeting with Chunwoo Han and learning he can't be overly dependent on others, Shiwoon begins to improve himself, becoming more convicted to his sense of justice. In order to fix his body's weak Qi, Shiwoon ingests the One Moon Divine Pill. Shiwoon is revealed to be a martial arts genius as he is able to learn techniques quickly. He is taught the Black Heaven and Earth Techniques by Chunwoo. During the course of the series, Shiwoon is instated as the head of the Sunwoo Clan. His Qi center is destroyed in The Breaker which prevents him from doing martial arts but is repaired over the course of New Waves.

Chunwoo Han
Chunwoo is the last user of the Black Heaven and Earth Techniques. He earned the title of Nine Arts Dragon in a Murim tournament after defeating the other Arts Dragons. Because of his victory, his teacher, Unwol, was killed by the Martial Arts Alliance out of spite. He joins the Black Forest Defense group as he intends to destroy the Martial Arts Alliance to avenge his master. He enters Shiwoon Yi's school to infiltrate Seoul for a mission and touched by Shiwoon's conviction, teaches him martial arts for a month before leaving Seoul. His lover, Shiho Lee is killed by the Martial Arts Alliance, furthering his hatred.

Sunwoo Clan
Sosul was the previous head of the Sunwoo Clan. She was held captive by the Martial Arts Alliance in order to control the Sunwoo Clan who were gaining political power equal to them. She is a teenager but has the appearance of a child because she is born with the Nine Yin Type Body. Chunwoo and the Black Forest Defense group free her from her captivity where she meets Shiwoon and develops a crush on him. She gave Shiwoon the Phoenix Medallion, essentially making him head of the Sunwoo Clan.
Jaekyu Kwon is one of the elders of the Sunwoo Clan. He is the grandfather and guardian to Jini following her mother's death. Initially, he intended to manipulate Shiwoon in order to rule and restore the Sun-Woo clan but came to have a change of heart after witnessing Shiwoon's conviction during a fight to protect Jini.
Jangil Jeon is an elder of the Sunwoo and grandfather figure to Shiwoon. During Shiwoon's fight against SUC., he sacrificed himself to save him. The other elders are Saoak Min and Suljoong Kim.
Gyubum Yi is part of the Sunwoo clan. His skills earned him the title of Southern Red Star. He acts as Shiwoon's escort in New Waves.
Jini Kwon is the granddaughter of Jaekyu, an elder of the Sun-Woo Clan. She was Shiwoon's bodyguard and becomes infatuated with him as the story progresses.
Hail Kang is a member of the Sunwoo Clan.

Martial Arts Alliance
The Alliance Chief in The Breaker is never referred to by name. He caused the death of Chunwoo's teacher out of spite. His desire for the Black Heaven and Earth Techniques caused him to lose his position after he attempted to use hostages to convince Chun-Woo to teach him the techniques.
Kangsung is a martial artist who stopped at the Three Arts Dragon rank out of respect for the Martial Arts Alliance. He becomes the Alliance Head after the events of The Breaker.
Sochun Hyuk is the acting head of the Heavenly Way School. He is a prodigy who was touched by Shiwoon's conviction.
Mungi Ma is the leader of the Torrent Clan which has allied itself with the Martial Arts Alliance. His clan was in charge of keeping Sosul captive. When he is about to be killed by Chunwoo, Shiwoon saved his life causing Mungi to swear loyalty to Shiwoon. He is known as the Northern Black Star due to his skills.
Jaemyung Cho is the head of the Iron Fist School, a school that specializes in physical strength and defense. He is killed by Chunwoo during the events of The Breaker.
Wonjae Hyun is the head of the One Moon School, a school which excels in medicine. He has a one sided love for Shiho and attempts to bring her back from the dead in New Waves.
Yaewon is the head of the Artist's Society School. She sympathizes with Chunwoo's hatred towards the Martial Arts Alliance. In New Waves, she teaches Shiwoon how to simulate battles within his mind in order to train.

Soldiers Under Command (SUC)
Changho is Shiwoon's bully who is extremely violent. When Changho tried to rape Sehee, Shiwoon scares him off. Feeling intimidated, Chang-Ho brings a weapon to school and attempts to kill him. He is expelled from school afterwards. In New Waves, he receives training from SUC and fails to kill Shiwoon again.
Jungchan Hyuk is the commander of SUC. His right hand man is Jegal. The five captains are: Yonghyun Yan, code named "Cool Guy". He prioritizes his pride over SUC's goals; Jiwoo Yi code named "Dark Princess". She dresses in a Gothic Lolita and is a cruel fighter. For unknown reason, she panics if the scar under her make up is exposed; Haru, code named "Thousand Faces". She excels in disguise and is able to adjust her skin and bones; Kwonyoung, code named "Blood Stream". He is known in the Murim as Western White Star; Ryuji, code named "Solitude". He knows how to use the Black Heaven and Earth Techniques as he was the disciple before Chunwoo.

Other characters
Sehee is Shiwoon's childhood friend. She is unaware of Shiwoon and the Murim world and lives as a normal high school girl.
Shiho Lee is an assassin who uses her charms for her missions. She is from the Heavenly Maiden Skill school and excels at medicine. She is killed during the events of The Breaker and put into stasis by Wonjae in New Waves.
Sera Kang is the head of the Mil-Yang Clan after her grandfather is killed by Chunwoo. She orchestrates an event involving Shiwoon in order to reinforce her position as the head of the Mil-Yang Clan. Afterwards, she becomes an ally to Shiwoon and helps him rebuild his Qi center. She has feelings for Shiwoon.
Jigun Yoo is a prodigy from the Strong Dragon School, school which excels in sword techniques. He transfers to Shiwoon's school during Sera's plan to reinforce her position as the head and fights Shiwoon on her behest. Jigun aims to destroy SUC for unknown reasons.

Release
The Breaker was serialized in Daiwon C.I.'s Young Champs magazine between June 1, 2007 and July 20, 2010. The series' individual chapters were encapsulated in ten volumes released between August 31, 2007 and July 27, 2010. The sequel, The Breaker: New Waves, was serialized on Daum Communications' online comics portal from October 2010 to May 2015. The Breaker has been translated in other languages such as French, Italian, Russian, and Polish.

Reception
Manga News described the plot of the beginning chapters of The Breaker as conventional but intriguing. In further volumes, Manga News praised the action and the increased pacing of the story. Animeland agreed and praised the series for its extraordinary action scenes.

References

External links
 Official webpage The Breaker Official website
 Official webpage The Breaker: New Waves Official website
 The Breaker: Eternal Force Naver Webtoon webpage

Manhwa titles
Daewon C.I. titles
2007 comics debuts